Yeste is a hamlet located within municipality of Las Peñas de Riglos, Aragon, Spain, 44 km far from the capital, Huesca. In 2006 it had a population of only 2, being completely unpopulated during the 20th century.

In 1845 it had its own Capital Hall and prison and a population of 117. That same year it joined Santa María de la Peña, a slightly larger village located, together with Triste, thus becoming the three of them under the same administrative area.

Populated places in the Province of Huesca

es:Yeste
it:Yeste
pt:Yeste